Saint Boniface Cathedral is a Roman Catholic cathedral of Saint Boniface, Winnipeg, Manitoba, Canada. It is an important building in Winnipeg, and is the principal church in the Roman Catholic Archdiocese of Saint Boniface, serving the eastern part of Manitoba province as well as the local Franco-Manitoban community. The church sits in the centre of the city at 190 avenue de la Cathédrale, Saint Boniface. Before the fire on July 22, 1968, which destroyed the previous building on site, the church was a minor basilica.

The Cathedral faces the Red River. In Verendrye Park is a statue of Pierre La Vérendrye by Joseph-Émile Brunet. Across the river is The Forks in Downtown Winnipeg.

History

In 1818, newly arrived Rev. Norbert Provencher and two colleagues constructed the first church on land on the east bank of the Red River donated by Hudson's Bay Company's Thomas Douglas, 5th Earl of Selkirk. The  small log building measured 50 feet by 30 feet and served as chapel, residence and school. It was soon replaced with a larger building. In 1832, Provencher, now bishop, built the first cathedral. "The bells of St. Boniface" are mentioned in John Greenleaf Whittier's 1859 poem "The Red River Voyageur". "On December 17, 1891, Whittier's 84th birthday, Archbishop Taché had "the bells of the Roman mission" rung in the poet's honour." 

On December 14, 1860, a fire destroyed "Provencher’s cathedral". In 1862, Bishop Taché went to Quebec to raise funds to rebuild the cathedral in stone. This second cathedral was somewhat smaller; the bell tower was completed eight years later.

Between 1888 and 1906, the number of Catholics in Saint Boniface had increased from 2,154 to 4,615, almost all of them of French heritage. By 1900, Saint Boniface was the fifth-largest city in the West and needed a larger cathedral. Local contractors Senecal and Smith were engaged to build a new cathedral to plans by Montreal architect Jean-Omer Marchand. On August 15, 1906, Monsignor Louis-Philippe Adélard Langevin dedicated the cathedral, which became one of the most imposing churches in Western Canada.

On July 22, 1968, the 1906 cathedral was damaged by a fire which destroyed many of the structure's features and contents including the rose window, vestments, 1860 bells, and parish records. Only the façade, sacristy, and the walls of the old church remained. In 1972, a new, smaller cathedral, designed by Étienne Gaboury and Denis Lussier, was built behind the 1906 façade.

The Institute for stained glass in Canada has documented the stained glass at St Boniface Cathedral.

Cathedral cemetery 
The remains of Chief One Arrow were interred at the cemetery from his death in the 1880s until August 2007, when his body was exhumed and sent to One Arrow First Nation in Saskatchewan. 

Other notable people buried in the cathedral cemetery include: 

 Louis Riel (1844–1885)
 Louis Riel, Sr. (1817–1864)
 Ambroise-Dydime Lépine (1840–1923)
Jean-Baptiste Lagimodière (1778–1855)
 Marie-Anne Gaboury (1780–1875)
 Norbert Provencher (1787–1853)
 Vital-Justin Grandin (1829–1902)
 Rosario Couture (1905–1986)

References

External links 

University of Manitoba Interior Photograph
 "Notre Dame brings back memories of St. Boniface Cathedral fire", CHVN95.1FM 
 "The Red River Voyageur", John Greenleaf Whittier

Roman Catholic cathedrals in Manitoba
Roman Catholic churches in Winnipeg
Basilica churches in Canada
Burned buildings and structures in Canada
1818 establishments in the British Empire
Cemeteries in Manitoba
20th-century Roman Catholic church buildings in Canada
Cathedral
Municipal Historical Resources of Winnipeg